Asemanabad Rural District is a rural district (dehestan) in the Central District of Chardavol County, Ilam Province, Iran. At the 2006 census, its population was 6,411, in 1,270 families.  The rural district has 11 villages.

References 

Rural Districts of Ilam Province
Chardavol County